This article is a list of events in the year 1993 in Senegal.

Incumbents
 President: Abdou Diouf
 Prime Minister: Mamadou Lamine Loum

Events
February 7: the delimitation treaty between Senegal and Cape Verde was signed

Sports
AS Douanes won the Senegal Premier League football championship

References

 
1990s in Senegal
Years of the 20th century in Senegal
Senegal
Senegal